Chris Barton (born 21 March 1987 in Liverpool, England) is an English actor and singer who appeared in the BBC talent show Any Dream Will Do and went on to appear in musical theatre productions in the West End and across the UK.

Early career
Barton trained at The Hammond School in Chester, a specialist dance school where he was given a scholarship to attend for five years. It was full-time and he also boarded at the school. He trained in ballet, jazz, tap, contemporary dance, singing and drama. Barton furthered his training at the Liverpool Theatre School, from which he graduated in 2007, gaining a National Diploma in musical theatre.

Any Dream Will Do
In Barton's third year of college, in 2007, he successfully auditioned for the BBC reality television talent show Any Dream Will Do, where he worked closely with Andrew Lloyd Webber. The show was hosted by Graham Norton and was the second West End talent show to be produced by the BBC and Lloyd Webber. Barton was selected from thousands of auditionees and was invited to attend "Joseph School" where, after surviving further auditions and elimination rounds, he reached the final 12, singing live on television every Saturday night. One of the judges, Denise Van Outen, commented at Barton's early audition, that when he performed, the "hairs on her arms stood on end". Another judge, Zoe Tyler's, reaction to his audition was "Wow!".

Studio performances
Week 1 – "Walking in Memphis" (Marc Cohn)
Week 2 – "I'll Be There" (Jackson 5)
Week 3 – "Tell Her About It" (Billy Joel)
Week 4 – "All Night Long (All Night)" (Lionel Richie)

Barton was the fifth to leave the competition and was offered the role of Benjamin in Bill Kenwright's touring production of Joseph and the Amazing Technicolor Dreamcoat. He played Joseph at certain performances and narrator. Barton recorded an album with other Joseph friends called Dream On, following which they performed a concert at the London Palladium.

Further career
Barton went on to play the older Benny in Our Benny, a rags to riches musical set in Liverpool. He then took part in his first West End show, Spring Awakening, a musical that won eight Tony Awards on Broadway and won "Best New Musical" in London at the Olivier Awards. Barton, as Swing in Spring Awakening, had the opportunity to play most roles within the show during his time in the production, including the lead role of Melchior Gabor. After seven months in Spring Awakening, he moved on to a role in the hit West End musical, Hairspray, where he played Sketch, leaving in March 2010.

The Sound of Music
In summer 2010, Barton played Rolf in the UK touring production of The Sound of Music starring alongside Connie Fisher who won the BBC Talent show in the year before Any Dream Will Do – How Do You Solve A Problem Like Maria. Barton continued in the 2011 tour of the show alongside Verity Rushworth and Jason Donovan until the summer that year.

Coronation Street- Street of Dreams
After 18 months as Rolf in The Sound of Music, Barton joined the Paul O'Grady in the original cast of Street of Dreams, a musical based on the TV soap Coronation Street, at the Manchester Arena.

Other work
Barton has recently studied TV and film acting at Manchester School of Acting with the acting coach Mark Hudson. Barton has appeared in many television programs since, such as, Hollyoaks, Coronation Street, Emmerdale and From Here to There. He appeared in Channel 4's drama Cucumber as an assistant to the actress Tupele Dorgu. He has also appeared in television commercials for leading brands, such as Nike, Injury Lawyers For You and Co-operative Food.

Barton was in the UK premiere of It's Only Life, a contemporary musical written by John Bucchino, performed at the Brighton Fringe in May 2015.

Barton is currently filming a pilot for a major television broadcaster and was cast in the long running musical Starlight Express (written by Andrew Lloyd Webber) and was due to start rehearsals in February 2016.

References

External links
Chris Barton's official website
The Sound of Music UK tour

1987 births
Living people
Male actors from Liverpool
English male musical theatre actors